Brian Leonardo Nicolás Leiva Vargas (born 21 February 1998) is a Chilean professional footballer who plays as a forward for Chilean Segunda División side San Antonio Unido.

Honours

Club
Universidad Católica
 Primera División de Chile (1): 2018

References

External links
 

1998 births
Living people
People from Punta Arenas
Chilean footballers
Chile youth international footballers
Chilean Primera División players
Primera B de Chile players
Segunda División Profesional de Chile players
Club Deportivo Universidad Católica footballers
Deportes Melipilla footballers
Deportes Iberia footballers
San Antonio Unido footballers
Association football forwards